The 2023 NXT Roadblock was the fourth Roadblock professional wrestling event produced by WWE. It was primarily for wrestlers from the NXT brand division. Like the previous Roadblock event, NXT Roadblock aired as a special episode of NXT on the USA Network. The television special took place on March 7, 2023, at the WWE Performance Center in Orlando, Florida. The event's title is a reference to its position on the road to NXT Stand & Deliver, NXT's WrestleMania Weekend event.

Five matches were contested at the event. In the main event, Roxanne Perez defeated Meiko Satomura to retain the NXT Women's Championship. The event also saw the WWE debut of Dragon Lee.

Production

Background 
Roadblock is a professional wrestling event established by WWE in 2016. The inaugural event was held in March that year and aired exclusively on the WWE Network. The event's name was a reference to its position on the "Road to WrestleMania". In July 2016, WWE reintroduced the brand extension, where the roster was divided between brands where wrestlers were exclusively assigned to perform. Roadblock was brought back that same year in December as a Raw-exclusive event under the title Roadblock: End of the Line. It aired on pay-per-view (PPV) and the WWE Network with its name being in reference to being WWE's final PPV of 2016. Roadblock was then discontinued without any further events scheduled. However, Roadblock was revived for the NXT brand as a television special episode of NXT titled NXT Roadblock. On the February 14, 2023, episode of NXT, it was announced that the 2023 NXT Roadblock would take place on March 7, 2023.

Storylines  
The card included matches that resulted from scripted storylines, where wrestlers portrayed villains, heroes, or less distinguishable characters in scripted events that built tension and culminated in a wrestling match or series of matches. Results were predetermined by WWE's writers on the NXT brand, while storylines were produced on the weekly television program, NXT, and the supplementary online streaming show, Level Up.

On the February 14 episode of NXT, after winning their tag team match, Meiko Satomura challenged Roxanne Perez to an NXT Women's Championship match, which Perez accepted. The following week, the bout was made official for Roadblock.

On the December 27, 2022, episode of NXT, Tony D'Angelo lost his NXT North American Championship match after interference from Dijak. At NXT: New Year's Evil on January 10, 2023, Dijak defeated D'Angelo to become the number one contender for the title at NXT Vengeance Day. At the event, Dijak failed to win the title after interference from D'Angelo and Channing "Stacks" Lorenzo. On the February 21 episode, D'Angelo challenged Dijak to a Jailhouse Street Fight at Roadblock, which Dijak accepted a week later.

At NXT Vengeance Day, Toxic Attraction members Gigi Dolin and Jacy Jayne failed to win the NXT Women's Championship in a triple threat match. On the following episode of NXT, during a "Ding Dong, Hello!" segment hosted by Bayley, Jayne attacked Dolin, breaking up Toxic Attraction. Over the next few weeks, Dolin and Jayne talked about their breakup and on the February 28 episode, a match between the two was scheduled for Roadblock.

At NXT Vengeance Day, Grayson Waller failed to win the NXT Championship in a Steel Cage match. After the event, he stormed into Shawn Michaels' office, resulting in him being suspended for a week. After more confrontations, on the February 21 episode of NXT, Waller told Michaels to meet him face-to-face at Roadblock, which was confirmed the following week.

Event

Preliminary matches
The television special began with Tony D'Angelo (accompanied by Channing "Stacks" Lorenzo) taking on Dijak in a Jailhouse Street Fight. The rules were that there was no disqualifications, and that the match could only end when an opponent is locked in a cell. In the closing stages, with Lorenzo knocked out, as Dijak tried to drag D'Angelo into the cell after performing Feast Your Eyes, D'Angelo found a crowbar and struck Dijak with it before dragging him into the cell and slamming the door shut to win the match.

Next, NXT Tag Team Champions Gallus (Mark Coffey and Wolfgang) called out Pretty Deadly (Kit Wilson and Elton Prince), who appeared from an elevated platform. After Gallus laid out the title belts in the ring, Wilson and Prince tried to retrieve them, only for Gallus to beat them down and send them retreating. It was later announced that an NXT Tag Team Championship match between Gallus and Pretty Deadly was made official for the following week.

In the next match, The Creed Brothers (Brutus Creed and Julius Creed) and NXT Champion Bron Breakker (accompanied by Ivy Nile) took on Jinder Mahal and Indus Sher (Veer Mahaan and Sanga) in a six-man tag team match. Before the match, a brawl broke out between the two teams. In the closing moments, Breakker performed a Spear on Mahal before doing the same to Sanga. Mahaan was able to stun Breakker, however, The Creed Brothers performed a Doomsday Brutus Ball on Mahaan to win the match.

Afterwards, Grayson Waller hosted The Waller Effect, with Shawn Michaels as the special guest. After the two talked about Michaels being in charge of NXT since September 2022, Michaels mentioned the legends NXT had created over the last few years. Waller then challenged Michaels to a match at NXT Stand & Deliver, but Michaels said that someone else would like to do it more. That person was revealed to be Johnny Gargano, in his first NXT appearance since December 2021. Gargano then cleared Waller from the ring before standing tall with Michaels to end the segment.

In the third match, Gigi Dolin took on Jacy Jayne. In the end, Dolin performed a rollup slam on Jayne to win the match. After the match, Jayne attacked Dolin and wrapped her head in a chair, only to be sent to the back by referees.

After that, NXT Champion Bron Breakker challenged Carmelo Hayes to a match at NXT Stand & Deliver. After the two hyped the match, Hayes accepted, but on the condition that Breakker put the title on the line.

In the penultimate match, Andre Chase (accompanied by Thea Hail and Duke Hudson) took on Joe Gacy (accompanied by Ava, Jagger Reid, and Rip Fowler). In the climax, while Hail did her breathing exercise and got at Ava's face, Hudson and Chase were distracted by that, allowing Gacy to perform the Upside-Down World on Chase to win the match.

Before the main event, NXT North American Champion Wes Lee was about to make another open challenge for the title, but was interrupted by Axiom. Lee told him that if he wanted the match, he would have to beat the entire locker room.

Main event
In the main event, Roxanne Perez defended the NXT Women's Championship against Meiko Satomura. After an even match between the two, Satomura performed a handstand legdrop for a nearfall. In the climax, Perez attempted Pop Rocks, but Satomura blocked by grabbing onto the ring apron. Back in the ring, Satomura performed Scorpio Rising on Perez, who grabbed the bottom rope to void the pin. As Satomura attempted a second Scorpio Rising, Perez countered into a roll-up to retain the title. After the match, Satomura passed the NXT Women's Championship belt to Perez, who suddenly collapsed. Perez was then taken out of the arena in an ambulance, while nodding her head to say that she was okay, as the show ended.

Aftermath
On the following episode of NXT, WWE executive Shawn Michaels issued a statement via Twitter that NXT Women's Champion Roxanne Perez was discharged from the hospital, however, after numerous tests, her health was still in question. As such, Michaels announced a ladder match at Stand & Deliver to crown a new NXT Women's Champion, with qualifying matches beginning that same episode.

Also on NXT, Gallus (Mark Coffey and Wolfgang) and Pretty Deadly (Kit Wilson and Elton Prince) had their match for the NXT Tag Team Championship, where Gallus retained.

Johnny Gargano talked about his return to NXT, and about missing a part of himself when he returned to Raw in August 2022. He also mentioned Waller disrespecting the fans and NXT when commentator Vic Joseph showed footage of Waller watching the show from Gargano's home. This led to a brawl between Gargano and Waller outside the house, which Waller got the better of.

NXT North American Champion Wes Lee's open challenge turned into a massive brawl, which Lee got the better of. Later that night, Shawn Michaels announced that Lee would be defending the title in a fatal five-way match at Stand & Deliver, with Lee selecting his opponents.

Results

References

External links 
 

WWE Roadblock
2023 in professional wrestling in Florida
Events in Orlando, Florida
Professional wrestling in Florida
Events in Florida
March 2023 events in the United States